Isak Cornelius Christiaan Fritz is a South African politician who has been a Member of the Northern Cape Provincial Legislature for the Democratic Alliance since May 2014.

Political career
Fritz is a member of the Democratic Alliance. He was elected as a Member of the Northern Cape Provincial Legislature in the  7 May 2014 provincial election, as he was placed seventh on the party's provincial list and the party won seven seats. He was sworn in as an MPL on 21 May 2014.

Fritz was re-elected for a second term in the 8 May 2019 provincial election, as he was once again seventh and the party won eight seats. He took office for his new term on 22 May 2019.

In 2020, he declared that he was a candidate to replace Harold McGluwa as provincial chairperson of the DA. The provincial congress was held on 5 December 2020. Fritz won the election.

References

External links
Mr Isak Cornelius Christian Fritz at Northern Cape Provincial Legislature

Living people
Year of birth missing (living people)
People from the Northern Cape
Democratic Alliance (South Africa) politicians
Members of the Northern Cape Provincial Legislature
Coloured South African people
21st-century South African politicians